Jean-Marie Loret (25 March 1918 – 14 February 1985) was a French railway worker and allegedly Adolf Hitler's illegitimate son. According to Loret, his mother revealed to him shortly before her death in 1948 that the "unknown German soldier" with whom she had an affair during World War I was Adolf Hitler.

Heinz Linge, who served as valet for Adolf Hitler, claimed in his memoirs With Hitler to the End that on 24 June 1940 Hitler secretly tasked Heinrich Himmler with finding Loret and his mother.

Loret's claim was backed by German historian Werner Maser, who first brought the claim to public attention in 1977 newspapers following an article in Zeitgeschichte magazine. Loret published his own autobiography, Ton père s'appelait Hitler [Your father was called Hitler] in 1981.

However, the dominant view represented by historians such as Anton Joachimsthaler, Timothy Ryback, Sir Ian Kershaw, and Belgian journalist Jean-Paul Mulders, is that Hitler's paternity of Loret is unlikely or impossible to prove.

Biography 

Jean-Marie Loret was born illegitimately in 1918 in Seboncourt as Jean-Marie Lobjoie. His mother was Charlotte Eudoxie Alida Lobjoie (1898–1951), daughter of Louis Joseph Alfred Lobjoie, a butcher, and his wife Marie Flore Philomène (Colpin) Lobjoie. According to the birth registry of his home town, Loret's father was an unidentified German soldier during World War I. Adolf Hitler had stayed in the localities of Seclin, Fournes-en-Weppes, Wavrin, and Ardooie during the years 1916 and 1917, and, according to eyewitnesses, he supposedly had a relationship with Charlotte Lobjoie. As a result, the idea that Hitler could be Loret's father was a perennial topic of discussion.

Charlotte Lobjoie was a dancer, although she apparently only took up the profession after she moved to Paris, months after the birth of Jean-Marie and the end of the war. Jean-Marie spent his first seven years with his grandparents, with whom Charlotte had no contact after moving to Paris. On 22 May 1922, Charlotte married Clément Loret, a lithographer, who declared he would support his wife's illegitimate son and would allow him to bear his own last name. According to Jean-Marie, his grandparents had "treated him badly." After their deaths in the mid 1920s, his aunt, Alice Lobjoie, worked to have her nephew adopted by the family of the wealthy construction magnate Frizon from Saint Quentin. From then on, Jean-Marie attended consecutively Catholic boarding schools in Cambrai and Saint Quentin.

In 1936, Jean-Marie entered the French army and was promoted over the years to staff sergeant. After World War II, he was a businessman, but had to give that up in 1948 because of insolvency.

Loret said he always knew that his father had been a German soldier, but he had no idea of his identity. He claimed that his mother told him in 1948, shortly before her death, that the soldier was Adolf Hitler.

During World War II Loret worked as chargé de mission with the French police in Saint-Quentin, Aisne. He claimed he got the job by Hitler's order, though there is nothing concrete to support this. Charges that he had collaborated with Gestapo units in France are also unproven. There were no charges of collaboration against him after the war. Loret has said that Hitler ordered all material on Loret to be destroyed. However, Loret was considered only an average individual and not overly diligent. It would have been unusual for him to have gained such a high post on his own merit when still in his early twenties.

Loret was married and had three children. Some sources claim his wife separated from him in 1948 when she learned he was Hitler's son. Some newspaper articles mention his wife as Muguette, who was still living with him at the time. It is unclear whether she was his first wife or a new one.

On 8 June 1978, during a public discussion, historian Werner Maser moved Loret to his own house in Speyer, Germany, to seclude him from the intense scrutiny by the press of Loret's home in Saint-Quentin. Maser and Loret visited several places, including the former concentration camp at Dachau, where Loret supposedly said: "I didn't choose my father."

Maser took Loret with him as he travelled to lecture on his parentage, even bringing him to Tokyo. However, the Frenchman was reluctant to give interviews.

In 1979, Loret and Maser had a falling-out and parted company. Subsequently, Loret, in collaboration with René Mathot, published his autobiography, Ton père s'appelait Hitler [Your father was called Hitler] (Paris, 1981).

The Loret–Hitler connection 
The story of "Hitler's son" was first revealed to the public in the 1970s, most prominently in various illustrated magazines such as Bunte, but also in more reputable publications, such as the historical journal Zeitgeschichte and the news magazine Der Spiegel.  The latter published the most influential story on Loret to date under the title "Love in Flanders".

The ultimate origin of the story of Hitler's son, at first spread only by word of mouth, was until then not determined, although written accounts maintaining that the illegitimate son of a French woman and a German soldier was Hitler's son had already been around for a fairly long time in Loret's hometown when Loret became known to German historian Werner Maser. Whether the rumors had been put out into the world by Loret himself or by others has never been determined.  Hitler himself admitted he fathered a child, presumably Loret.  In his book With Hitler to the End: The Memoirs of Adolf Hitler's Valet (1980), Heinz Linge states that Hitler had stated to a number of people "his belief that he had a son, born in 1918 as the result of a relationship Hitler had had with a French girl as a soldier in 1916–1917 in northern France and Belgium...."

Maser maintained that he had heard of a reputed son of Hitler for the first time in 1965 while doing research in Wavrin and surrounding cities. He followed up on these reports, met Loret in the process, and was able to convince him to let the story be published. Maser exerted great effort to gather evidence to support it, however, historians including Anton Joachimsthaler have criticised this, alleging that Maser was subordinating the scholarly pursuit of truth in order to pursue commercial motives such as sensationalism and enjoyment of scandal.

According to Maser's portrayal, the Loret–Hitler connection occurred as follows: Hitler had met Charlotte Lobjoie in 1916 in the city of Wavrin, in the German-occupied part of France, while stationed there as a soldier, and had begun a romantic relationship with her. Loret had been conceived in the summer of 1917 in Ardooie or, according to other sources, in the fall of 1917 in Le Ceteau. The latter scenario is the less likely variant since it would require a premature birth.

Maser wrote in his Hitler biography on the relationship of Hitler and Lobjoie:

At the beginning of 1916 the young woman had met the German soldier Adolf Hitler for the first time. She stayed first in Premont, allowed herself to fall into a sexual relationship with him, and followed him until autumn 1917 to, among other places, Seboncourt, Forunes, Wavrin and Noyelles-lès-Seclin in Northern France – and, in May, June and July 1917, also to Ardooie in Belgium (p. 528).

The critics of this account pointed out that Maser had no evidence of this beyond Loret's own claims, which were secondhand at best. A genetic certification of his biological inheritance, done at the University of Heidelberg, resulted in the findings that "at best, Loret could be Hitler's son", but that he need not be such.

Maser claimed that evidence for Hitler's paternity included Charlotte Lobjoie's commitment to a French sanatorium (allegedly at Hitler's instruction) after the German invasion of France, and a protracted interrogation of Loret by the Gestapo in the Hotel Lutetia, the Gestapo headquarters in Paris, as well as Loret's alleged collaboration with the Gestapo as a policeman.

Maser's questioning of Alice Lobjoie, Loret's aunt and Charlotte's sister, whom he had wanted to bring into play as "crown witness" for his claim, rendered, instead, a negative result: Alice Lobjoie stated that her sister had indeed entertained a love relationship with a German soldier, but she disputed vehemently that this soldier had been Adolf Hitler. She stated that she could remember the man's face quite well and knew that this face had no resemblance to Hitler. In addition, she stated for the record: "Jean is a nutcase. Only the Germans talked up that Hitler story to him."

In addition to Alice Lobjoie's assertion, critics of Maser's thesis, such as historian Joachimsthaler, among others, introduced into the debate testimonials from Hitler's war comrades, who, in their recollections of Hitler in the First World War, unanimously noted that he was absolutely against any relationships between German soldiers and French women. Balthasar Brandmayer for example, in his 1932 memoir Two Dispatch-Runners, reported that Hitler had reacted in the most violent terms against the intent of his regiment-mates to get involved with French women and had reproached them for having "no German sense of honour".

In addition, the critics asserted logical inconsistencies in Maser's story: that it is highly improbable that any soldier in the war, let alone a private ranking low in the military hierarchy, would have been able to take a lover with him through all the relocations of his regiment, as Hitler had done with Lobjoie, according to Maser's account. Free movement would scarcely have been possible in the occupied areas, and having Charlotte travel along with the regiment is very doubtful.

During the course of the 1979 Aschaffenburger Historians' Moot, Maser at first kept quiet on the matter. Finally, in his own contribution to the discussion, he abruptly declared a possible illegitimate son of Hitler to be a marginal matter. Joachimsthaler designated this Maser's "own private end goal".

The Daily Express claimed, in an article dated 15 February 1985, that a portrait of Loret's mother had been found, after Hitler's death, among the latter's possessions, but had no evidence for this claim. In point of fact, a portrait done by Adolf Hitler in the year 1916 that purportedly depicted Charlotte Lobjoie with head-scarf and with fork in hand was tracked to a Belgian entrepreneur in the 1960s and was published in an issue of the journal Panorama at the beginning of the 1970s. Therefore, it is highly unlikely that this same portrait was found among Hitler's possessions in 1945. One should in this case trace the origin of the claim to a misunderstanding.

Following the 2005 publication of his book Fälschung, Dichtung und Wahrheit über Hitler und Stalin (Forgery, Poetry and Truth about Hitler and Stalin), Maser reaffirmed in an interview with the extreme right-wing-oriented National-Zeitung that he stood by his thesis, just as before, and maintained that Loret "was unambiguously Hitler's son", and that this had been "acknowledged in France on the part of officials". The 12th edition of Maser's book Adolf Hitler: Legend, Myth, Reality, contains an appendix on this subject.

Later media coverage 

In 2008 the Belgian journalist Jean-Paul Mulders travelled to Germany, Austria, France and the United States to collect DNA of the last living relatives of Hitler in Austria and on Long Island. He also obtained DNA from postcard stamps sent by Jean-Marie Loret. By comparing DNA from the stamps with that of Hitler's relatives, Mulders claimed proof that Jean-Marie Loret was not the son of Adolf Hitler. The results of his research were published in Het Laatste Nieuws, Belgium's largest newspaper. In February 2009 a book on this subject was published by Herbig Verlag in Munich: Auf der Suche nach Hitlers Sohn – Eine Beweisaufnahme.

On 17 February 2012, the French magazine Le Point wrote a news article, reporting that studies from the seventies by the University of Heidelberg showed Hitler and Loret were of the same blood group and that another study showed they had similar handwriting. The article also stated that official German Army paperwork proves officers brought envelopes of cash to Miss Lobjoie during the World War II occupation. The magazine also described a suggestion by the family's lawyer that they may be able to claim royalties from Hitler's Mein Kampf. The article was repeated the same day by other international newspapers such as The Daily Telegraph and the National Post, who both misinterpreted the original article by claiming the French based their article on new studies. According to these newspapers a revised edition of Loret's book would be published containing the 'new' findings. The French article, however, did not mention a revised edition.

In 2018 Russian state-owned TV channel NTV interviewed a man named Philippe Loret who is supposedly a son of Jean-Marie Loret. Loret claims to be the grandson of Hitler. The documentary is filmed at Loret's home, which is decorated with Nazi relics. In the documentary Loret speaks of a Rothschild family conspiracy. It was reported in 2018 that Loret's son Philippe would undergo a DNA test to determine if he is Hitler's grandson, but the results are unknown as of 2023.

Sources

Further reading 
Marc Vermeeren, "De jeugd van Adolf Hitler 1889–1907 en zijn familie en voorouders". Soesterberg, 2007, 420 blz. Uitgeverij Aspekt.  
 Jean Loret: Ton père s'appelait Hitler [Your Father Was Named Hitler], Paris, 1981.
 Donald M. McKale: Hitler's Children: A Study of Postwar Mythology, in: The Journal of Popular Culture, Vol. 15, issue 1 (1981), p. 46.

External links 
 Werner Maser: Adolf Hitler: Vater eines Sohnes ("Adolf Hitler: Father of a Son") – full German text of pp. 178–202 is on the ANNO (AustriaN Newspapers Online) – web pages of the Austrian National Library (Österreichische Nationalbibliothek)
 
 

Hitler family
1918 births
1985 deaths
French people of Austrian descent
French Army personnel of World War II
French Army soldiers